Kachaleh or Kachleh may refer to:
 Kachleh, Kurdistan
 Kachaleh, West Azerbaijan